Joseph Wilson Vaka (born 21 November 1980) in Kolofo'ou, Tonga) is rugby union footballer. He plays at outside centre or wing.  He played for Havelock Sports Club in Sri Lanka in 2007 before moving to Japan. He was with the World Fighting Bulls in Kobe, Hyogo before he came to Toyota Shokki Shuttles in Kariya, Aichi where he currently resides.

In 2007 Vaka was cautioned by UK police after assaulting a fan at Heathrow airport.

Personal life
Vaka is a member of the Church of Jesus Christ of Latter-day Saints.

References

1980 births
Living people
Tongan Latter Day Saints
Tongan rugby union players
People from Nukuʻalofa
Rugby union wings
Tonga international rugby union players
Tongan expatriate rugby union players
Expatriate rugby union players in Sri Lanka
Expatriate rugby union players in Japan
Tongan expatriate sportspeople in Sri Lanka
Tongan expatriate sportspeople in Japan
Toyota Industries Shuttles Aichi players